Chryseobacterium vrystaatense  is a Gram-negative bacteria from the genus of Chryseobacterium which has been isolated from a raw chicken from a chicken processing plant in Vrystaat in South Africa.

References

Further reading

External links
Type strain of Chryseobacterium vrystaatense at BacDive -  the Bacterial Diversity Metadatabase

vrystaatense
Bacteria described in 2005